Arthur Henfrey (1 November 1819 – 7 September 1859) was an English surgeon and botanist.

Life
Henfrey was born of English parents at Aberdeen on 1 November 1819. He studied medicine and surgery at St. Bartholomew's Hospital, London, and was admitted a member of the Royal College of Surgeons in 1843. Poor health caused him to give up his medical career.

In 1847 Henfrey lectured on plants at the medical school of St. George's Hospital. He then succeeded Edward Forbes in the botanical chair at King's College London in 1853; and was examiner in natural history to the Royal Military Academy and also to the Society of Arts. He was elected an associate of the Linnean Society in 1843, and a fellow in the next year. In 1852 he was elected a fellow of the Royal Society.

Henfrey died at Turnham Green on 7 September 1859. The genus Henfreya of John Lindley, of the Acanthaceæ, was merged into the Asystasia of Blume.

Works

Henfrey wrote:

 Anatomical Manipulations, 1844, with Alfred Tulk. 
 Outlines of Structural and Physiological Botany, 1847. 
 Reports and Papers on Botany, Ray Society, 1849. 
 The Rudiments of Botany, 1849; 2nd edit. 1859. 
 The Vegetation of Europe, its Conditions and Causes, 1852.
 The Relations of Botanical Science to other Branches of Knowledge, 1854. 
 Introductory Address, King's College, London, 1856. 
 An Elementary Course of Botany, 1857; fourth ed. 1884.
 On the Educational Claims of Botanical Science, 1857.

He translated:

 On Vegetable Cells, by Carl von Nägeli; for the Ray Society, 1846. 
 Chemical Field Lectures, by Julius Adolph Stöckhardt, 1847. 
 The Earth, Plants, and Man, by Joakim Frederik Schouw, 1847. 
 The Plant, by Matthias Schleiden, 1848. 
 Principles of the Anatomy of the Vegetable Cell, by Hugo von Mohl, 1851.
 In: Botanical and physiological memoirs…, 1853:
 The phenomenon of rejuvenescence in nature, especially in the life and development of plants, by Alexander Braun.

Henfrey also edited:

 Scientific Memoirs (New Series, Natural History), 1837, with Thomas Henry Huxley. 
 The Botanical Gazette, 1849. 
 Journal of the Photographic Society, vols. i. and ii., 1853. 
 Micrographic Dictionary, 1854, with John William Griffith. 
 A revised and enlarged edition of George William Francis's Anatomy of the British Ferns, 1855.

Family
Henfrey married Elizabeth Anne Henry, eldest daughter of the Hon. Jabez Henry. She survived her husband for more than 40 years, and died 86 years old at Hanworth House, Chertsey, on 10 October 1902. Henry William Henfrey the numismatist was their son.

References

Attribution

External links
 Digitized works by or about Arthur Henfrey at Biodiversity Heritage Library

1819 births
1859 deaths
Academics of King's College London
English surgeons
English botanists
Fellows of the Royal Society
Fellows of the Linnean Society of London